Everson v. Board of Education, 330 U.S. 1 (1947), was a landmark decision of the United States Supreme Court that applied the Establishment Clause of the First Amendment to state law. Prior to this decision, the clause, which states, "Congress shall make no law respecting an establishment of religion", imposed limits only on the federal government, while many states continued to grant certain religious denominations legislative or effective privileges.

It was the first Supreme Court case incorporating the Establishment Clause of the First Amendment as binding upon the states through the Due Process Clause of the Fourteenth Amendment. Everson marked a turning point in the interpretation and application of disestablishment law in the modern era. 

The case was brought by a New Jersey taxpayer against a tax-funded school district that provided reimbursement to parents of both public and private schooled people taking the public transportation system to school. The taxpayer contended that reimbursement given for children attending private religious schools violated the constitutional prohibition against state support of religion, and the use of taxpayer funds to do so violated the Due Process Clause. The Justices were split over the question whether the New Jersey policy constituted support of religion, with the majority concluding that the reimbursements were "separate and so indisputably marked off from the religious function" that they did not violate the constitution. Both affirming and dissenting Justices, however, were decisive that the Constitution required a sharp separation between government and religion, and their strongly-worded opinions paved the way to a series of later court decisions that taken together brought about profound changes in legislation, public education, and other policies involving matters of religion. Both Justice Hugo Black's majority opinion and Justice Wiley Rutledge's dissenting opinion defined the First Amendment religious clause in terms of a "wall of separation between church and state."

Background
After repealing a former ban, a New Jersey law authorized payment by local school boards of the costs of transportation to and from schools, including private schools. Of the private schools that benefited from this policy, 96 percent were parochial Catholic schools. Arch R. Everson, a taxpayer in Ewing Township, filed a lawsuit alleging that the indirect aid to religion through the mechanism of reimbursing parents and students for costs incurred as a result of attending religious schools violated both the New Jersey Constitution and the First Amendment of the US Constitution. After a loss in the New Jersey Court of Errors and Appeals, then the state's highest court, Everson appealed to the US Supreme Court, purely on federal constitutional grounds.

Decision
The 5–4 decision was handed down on February 10, 1947, and was based upon James Madison's Memorial and Remonstrance Against Religious Assessments and Thomas Jefferson's Virginia Statute for Religious Freedom. In a majority opinion written by Justice Hugo Black, the Supreme Court ruled that the state bill was constitutionally permissible because the reimbursements were offered to all students, regardless of religion, and because the payments were made to parents, not to any religious institution. Perhaps as important as the actual outcome, however, was the interpretation given by the Court to the Establishment Clause. It reflected a broad interpretation of the Clause that was to guide the Court's decisions for decades to come. Black's language was sweeping:

The 'establishment of religion' clause of the First Amendment means at least this: Neither a state nor the Federal Government can set up a church. Neither can pass laws which aid one religion, aid all religions or prefer one religion over another. Neither can force nor influence a person to go to or to remain away from church against his will or force him to profess a belief or disbelief in any religion. No person can be punished for entertaining or professing religious beliefs or disbeliefs, for church attendance or non-attendance. No tax in any amount, large or small, can be levied to support any religious activities or institutions, whatever they may be called, or whatever form they may adopt to teach or practice religion. Neither a state nor the Federal Government can, openly or secretly, participate in the affairs of any religious organizations or groups and vice versa. In the words of Jefferson, the clause against establishment of religion by law was intended to erect 'a wall of separation between Church and State.' [...] The First Amendment has erected a wall between church and state. That wall must be kept high and impregnable. 330 U.S. 1, 15-16 and 18.

Justice Jackson wrote a dissenting opinion in which he was joined by Justice Frankfurter. Justice Rutledge wrote another dissenting opinion in which he was joined by Justices Frankfurter, Jackson and Burton. The four dissenters agreed with Justice Black's definition of the Establishment Clause but protested that the principles that he laid down would logically lead to the invalidation of the challenged law.

In his written dissent, Justice Rutledge argued:

The funds used here were raised by taxation. The Court does not dispute nor could it that their use does in fact give aid and encouragement to religious instruction. It only concludes that this aid is not 'support' in law. But Madison and Jefferson were concerned with aid and support in fact not as a legal conclusion 'entangled in precedents.' Here parents pay money to send their children to parochial schools and funds raised by taxation are used to reimburse them. This not only helps the children to get to school and the parents to send them. It aids them in a substantial way to get the very thing which they are sent to the particular school to secure, namely, religious training and teaching. 330 U.S. 1, 45.

Aftermath
In its first 100 years, the United States Supreme Court interpreted the Constitution's Bill of Rights as a limit on federal government and considered the states bound only by those rights granted to its citizens by their own state constitutions. Because the federal laws were then remote influences on most on the personal affairs of its citizens, minimal attention was paid by the Court to how those provisions in the federal Bill of Rights were to be interpreted.

Following the passage of the Thirteenth to the Fifteenth Amendments to the Constitution at the end of the American Civil War, the Supreme Court would hear hundreds of cases involving conflicts over the constitutionality of laws passed by the states. The decisions in those cases were often criticized as resulting more from the biases of the individual Justices than the applicable rule of law or constitutional duty to protect individual rights. However, by the 1930s, the Court began consistently reasoning that the Fourteenth Amendment guaranteed citizens First Amendment protections from even state and local governments, a process known as incorporation.

The 1940 decision in Cantwell v. Connecticut was the first Supreme Court decision to apply the First Amendment's religious protections to the states. The case focusing on the so-called Free Exercise Clause. Everson followed in 1947 and was the first decision that incorporated the Establishment Clause. Numerous state cases followed disentangling the church from public schools, most notably the 1951 New Mexico case of Zellers v. Huff.

Similar First Amendment cases have flooded the courts in the decades following Everson. Having invoked Jefferson's metaphor of the wall of separation in the Everson decision, lawmakers and courts have struggled how to balance governments' dual duty to satisfy the Establishment Clause and the Free Exercise Clause, both of which are contained in the language of the amendment. The majority and dissenting Justices in Everson split over the very question, with Rutledge in the minority by insisting that the Constitution forbids "every form of public aid or support for religion."

See also
List of United States Supreme Court cases, volume 330

References

Sources

External links

Establishment Clause case law
1947 in United States case law
Education in Mercer County, New Jersey
Ewing Township, New Jersey
Religion and education
Incorporation case law
United States Supreme Court cases
United States education case law
1947 in religion
1947 in education
American Civil Liberties Union litigation
United States Supreme Court cases of the Vinson Court
Religious policy